Dougie Poole is a singer-songwriter based in Brooklyn, New York.

History 
Dougie Poole's music has been described as an "intersection of experimental pop and outlaw country." He released his debut EP Olneyville System Special in 2016.

In 2017, Poole released his debut full-length album Wideass Highway. In a review of the album, Cameron Perry wrote that Poole "twists classic country into something strange and authentic." The Morning News included Wideass Highway in their list of The Top Albums of 2017. Dougie Poole's 2017 song "Don't You Think I'm Funny Anymore" was included in The Fader's list of under-appreciated songs from 2017. Dougie Poole has shared stages with Jerry Paper, Sean Nicholas Savage, Dark Tea, New Love Crowd, and Drugdealer amongst others.

Poole's sophomore album The Freelancer's Blues was released in June 2020.

Discography

Studio albums 

 Wideass Highway (2017)
 The Freelancer's Blues (2020)
 The Rainbow Wheel of Death (2023)

Singles and EPs 

 Olneyville System Special (2016)

References

External links 

 Official website

People from Brooklyn
Year of birth missing (living people)
Living people
American male singer-songwriters
Singer-songwriters from New York (state)